This is a list of avant-garde and experimental films released in the 1950s. Unless noted, all films had sound and were in black and white.

References 

Avant-garde
1950s